Terror Glacier may refer to:

 Mount Terror (Antarctica)  
 Terror Glacier (Washington), in the North Cascades National Park, Washington, USA